Norberto Juan Ortiz Osborne (born 7 December 1954), better known as Bertín Osborne, is a Spanish vocalist, actor and TV personality.  He was born in Madrid, but raised in Puerto de Santa María and later in Jerez de la Frontera. His maternal surname comes from a great-great-great grandfather who immigrated from Exeter, England to Puerto de Santa María, Spain during the late 18th century and founded the Osborne Group wine company.

He is also a businessman known for his entrepreneurships, and a restaurateur.

Music
Osborne's first musical performance was in 1971 at the Song Festival at El Escorial, but he had to wait until 1980 to sign his first contract to record an album.

Discography

Notes
A.  Motivation is an English-language album that was not released in Spain but appeared in other European territories. The Iperspazio pressing is from Italy. 
B.  Va Por Ellos is a fund-raising disc with proceeds benefiting Fundación Padre Garralda. In Spain, the disc was sold exclusively through El Corte Inglés locations.

Television 
 Mi casa es la tuya (Bertín as a host and interviewer)

Bertín is also known as an occasional actor. His acting is credited in several TV-novels and fiction TV-series, some of them were South American TV-productions. He has barely participated in film acting, but he is more of an actor when it comes to television series.

Personal life
Osborne was married to Alejandra "Sandra" Domecq Williams, from 1977 until their divorce in 1991. She died in 2004. The couple had three daughters: Alejandra (b. 1978), Eugenia (b. 1986) and Claudia (b. 1989), as well as a son (Cristian; 1977–1977), who died at less than one year of age.

He remarried, on 10 June 2006, Fabiola Martínez Benavides, from Maracaibo, Venezuela; the couple has two children, Norberto Enrique and Carlos Alberto. Norberto was diagnosed with cerebral palsy, which led Bertin to create the Fundación Bertín Osborne, a non-profit organization devoted to helping children with this diagnosis. Bertin has brought his son to The Institutes for the Achievement of Human Potential (IAHP) for treatment, and has used his foundation to spread the word in Spain about IAHP's work.

References

External links
 
 
 
 http://www.elpais.com/articulo/gente/tv/drama/familiar/Bertin/Osborne/elpepugen/20080619elpepuage_5/Tes
 https://web.archive.org/web/20101027012759/http://www.telecinco.es/lanoria/detail/detail20174.shtml
 https://web.archive.org/web/20140714204335/http://spanishcharts.com/search.asp?search=bertin+osborne&cat=a
 http://foropelayo.blogcindario.com/2008/05/01236-bertin-osborne-tener-un-hijo-con-problemas-te-hace-poner-los-pies-en-el-suelo.html
 http://www.bebesymas.com/compras-para-mamas-y-papas/dia-de-la-madre-rancheras-de-bertin-osborne-a-beneficio-de-los-ninos-desfavorecidos

1954 births
Living people
Spanish people of English descent
Spanish male singers
People from Jerez de la Frontera
Singers from Andalusia
People named in the Panama Papers